The Baby-Roast, also known as The Hippy Babysitter and The Cooked Baby, is an urban legend in which a baby is roasted alive at home by a babysitter or sibling. It is "one of the classic urban legends". There have been a few isolated cases where babies have been roasted.

Legend
In some versions, the baby is accidentally cooked when miscommunication occurs. For example, "put the turkey in the oven and the baby in the bed" is wrongly heard as "put the baby in the oven and the turkey in the bed". In other variants, the protagonist is intoxicated with drugs or alcohol, or insane. In the end, the roasted baby is sometimes served as food to be consumed by the parents.

The person who roasts the baby is usually a babysitter or the baby's sibling.

Documented occurrences
There have been documented occurrences of babies being roasted, though by family members rather than babysitters.  When Elizabeth Renee Otte roasted her baby in 1999 in Virginia, she was said to have caused the legend to become true. In November 2006, a second case of real-life baby-roasting was reported.

In May 2012, a British citizen was arrested by Thai police after being found in possession of six corpses of roasted infants, some wrapped in gold leaf, reportedly in conformity with a "black magic ritual". 

On November 16, 2015, a one-year old baby, J'Zyra Thompson, died after her three-year-old sibling put her in the oven and cooked her alive. Their mother, Racqual Thompson, left her four kids at home, which included a five-year-old and a two-year-old, when she went to pick up a pizza. When they returned home, Thompson found J'Zyra's body cooked in the oven. Thompson and her boyfriend of ten months, 21-year-old Cornell Malone, were charged with endangering a child. Thompson was then sentenced to 12 years in prison for abandoning a child under 15 years old.

In March 2016, a 35-year-old mother in Texas showed up naked at her neighbor's door with her partially burned and naked 2-year-old daughter. When police arrived, she confessed that she had put the girl in the oven along with a cat she had recently shot dead, while making sexual advances toward an officer and singing praise to God. According to an affidavit from the Texas Department of Family and Protective Services, she seemed unconcerned with her daughter while in hospital and jail, where she was charged with injury to a child with serious bodily injury and tested positive for alcohol, marijuana and methamphetamine. The girl was put in foster care.

In popular culture
In the 1979 blaxploitation film Avenging Disco Godfather, a PCP addict claims to have honey-roasted her baby for her family's Easter dinner, ostensibly so the baby's crying wouldn't spoil the occasion.

In August 2009, a joke advertisement showcasing a "body part roaster" "specially designed to roast infants and other human morsels" surfaced on the website of retailer Sears.com.

The song 'Babysitter on Acid' by the all-female punk rock band, Lunachicks is a retelling of the Urban Legend. The teenage babysitter, under the influence of drugs, roasts the baby in the oven and says to the mother over the phone "Wanna know how the baby is? / Don't worry, she's almost done". The song was released on their 1990 album Babysitters On Acid.

See also 
Atreus
A Modest Proposal

References

Infanticide
Urban legends
Cannibalism in fiction